Elias Allenspach (born 14 May 2001) is a Swiss snowboarder who competed in the men's halfpipe at the 2018 Winter Olympics, but did not qualify for the medal round.

References

2001 births
Living people
Swiss male snowboarders
Olympic snowboarders of Switzerland
Snowboarders at the 2018 Winter Olympics
21st-century Swiss people